Teresópolis is a Brazilian municipality located in the state of Rio de Janeiro, in a mountainous region known as Região Serrana. The Serra dos Órgãos National Park lies partly within the city limits. The city is known as the home of the Brazil national football team, since it hosts CBF's training ground at Granja Comary.

History

Before the arrival of the Portuguese to the area where Teresópolis lies today, in the 16th century, it was inhabited by indigenous Brazilians. In the following centuries, Portuguese started buying land there. The region was also occupied by a quilombo, formed by runaway slaves coming from sugar cane plantations near Rio de Janeiro.

In 1821, English citizen George March (born and raised in Portugal) established a farm there, which later became the most important settlement along the way between the court, in Rio de Janeiro, and the territory of Gerais (nowadays, the state of Minas Gerais), which led to the great improvement of agriculture and cattle raising.

The Brazilian imperial family was much impressed by the natural beauty and the climate of the region, which developed slowly so that in 1855 the settlement became a village that was named Freguesia de Santo Antonio de Paquequer.

The further development of the village was due to the traders that came from Minas Gerais in the way to Rio de Janeiro, and used the region as a resting stop. Finally, on July 6, 1891, the village became a municipality that was named Teresópolis ("city of Teresa"), after Empress Teresa Cristina, wife of Emperor Pedro II.

The uncontrolled growth of Teresópolis and other cities of the mountainous region near Rio de Janeiro led to the construction of a great number of houses in mountainous terrain or on the banks of rivers. This fact, together with a 24-hour rainfall that exceeded what was expected for the entire month, caused a series of floods and mudslides in January 2011. More than 400 people died and thousands lost their houses in the event, which is considered the worst weather-related tragedy in Brazilian history. .

Geography

According to the 2010 Brazilian Census, the city has a population of 163,746 within a land area of 770,6 km2. The Serra dos Órgãos National Park is in the vicinity. Its predominant vegetation belongs to the Atlantic Forest type. The city is surrounded by forests and by well-known summits or peaks, because of which the city is known as the national capital of mountaineering. The most famous peaks are:
 Peak of Pedra do Sino – 
 Peak of Pedra do Açu – 
 Peak of Agulha do Diabo – 
 Peak of Nariz do Frade – 
 Peak of Dedo de Deus – 
 Peak of Pedra da Ermitage – 
 Peak of Dedo de Nossa Senhora – 
Of these, Dedo de Deus ("God's finger") is the most famous.

The municipality contains the  Montanhas de Teresópolis Municipal Nature Park, created in 2009 to protect a large area of Atlantic Forest.
The municipality contained the  Floresta do Jacarandá Environmental Protection Area, but this was extinguished in 2013.
It contains the  Bacia dos Frades Environmental Protection Area, created in 1990.
The municipality contains 20% of the  Três Picos State Park, created in 2002.
It contains part of the Central Rio de Janeiro Atlantic Forest Mosaic of conservation units, created in 2006.

Climate

Teresópolis features a subtropical highland climate (Köppen climate classification: Cfb), with relatively cold and dry winters and mild and wet summers. The annual average temperature is 16 °C/60.8 °F.

Teresópolis has one of the mildest climates in Brazil and this is one reason why the area has been chosen as Brazilian Football Confederation's training headquarters, hosting the Brazil national football team, located in Granja Comary.

Gallery

Sister cities
Teresópolis' sister cities are:

  Rio de Janeiro

References

External links

Official
 City Hall (Prefeitura Municipal) 
 Municipal Legislative Chamber (Câmara Municipal)

Tourism
Visite Teresópolis - Tourism, Information, news, photos... 
Teresopolis.com.br - Complete guide to the city, Information, news, and photos 
TeresopolisOn - Information, news, and photos 
Portal Terê - Complete guide to the city 

 
1891 establishments in Brazil
Populated places established in 1891
Municipalities in Rio de Janeiro (state)